These are the individual stages of the 2010 Vuelta a España, with Stage 1 on 28 August and Stage 11 on 8 September.

Stages
 s.t. indicates that the rider crossed the finish line in the same group as the one receiving the time above him, and was therefore credited with the same finishing time.

Stage 1
28 August 2010 — Seville,  (Team time trial)

The course for the team time trial is flat, and takes place under lighting: beginning at 10pm.

Stage 2
29 August 2010 — Alcalá de Guadaíra to Marbella,

Stage 3
30 August 2010 — Marbella to Málaga,

Stage 4
31 August 2010 — Málaga to Jaén,

Stage 5
1 September 2010 — Guadix to Lorca,

Stage 6
2 September 2010 — Caravaca de la Cruz to Murcia,

Stage 7
3 September 2010 — Murcia to Orihuela,

Stage 8
4 September 2010 — Villena to Xorret del Catí,

Stage 9
5 September 2010 — Calpe to Alcoy,

Stage 10
7 September 2010 — Tarragona to Vilanova i la Geltrú,

Stage 11
8 September 2010 — Vilanova i la Geltrú to Vallnord (Andorra),

References

, Stage 1 To Stage 11, 2010 Vuelta A Espana
Vuelta a España stages